Bulcsú Székely (born 2 June 1976) is a Hungarian water polo player who played on the gold medal squad at the 2000 Summer Olympics.

Honours

National
 Olympic Games:  gold medal – 2000
 European Championship:  gold medal – 1997, 1999;  bronze medal – 2001
 FINA World League:  bronze medal – 2002
 Universiade: (gold medal - 2003; bronze medal – 1999)
 Junior World Championships: (gold medal – 1995)
 Junior European Championship: (gold medal – 1994)

Club
European competitions:
 Cup Winners' Cup winners (2): (1998 – with FTC; 2002 – with Vasas)
Domestic competitions:
 Hungarian Championship (OB I): 1x (2000 – with FTC)
 Hungarian Cup (Magyar Kupa): 4x (1996 (2) – with FTC; 2002 - with Vasas; 2006, 2010 – with Bp. Honvéd)
 Hungarian SuperCup (Szuperkupa): 1x (2001 – with Vasas)

Awards
 Masterly youth athlete: 1995
 Member of the Hungarian team of year: 1997, 1999, 2000
 Csanádi-díj: 2001

Orders
   Officer's Cross of the Order of Merit of the Republic of Hungary (2000)

See also
 Hungary men's Olympic water polo team records and statistics
 List of Olympic champions in men's water polo
 List of Olympic medalists in water polo (men)

References

External links
 

1976 births
Living people
Water polo players from Budapest
Hungarian male water polo players
Water polo drivers
Water polo players at the 2000 Summer Olympics
Medalists at the 2000 Summer Olympics
Olympic gold medalists for Hungary in water polo
Universiade medalists in water polo
Universiade gold medalists for Hungary
Universiade bronze medalists for Hungary
Vasas SC water polo players
Hungarian water polo coaches
Medalists at the 1999 Summer Universiade
Medalists at the 2003 Summer Universiade
20th-century Hungarian people
21st-century Hungarian people